Macrocneme adonis is a moth of the subfamily Arctiinae. It was described by Herbert Druce in 1884. It is found in Mexico, Guatemala and Panama.

References

Macrocneme
Moths described in 1884